Baruc Nsue Burcet (born 2 November 1984), simply known as Baruc, is a football midfielder who plays for UE Tona in the Spanish Primera Catalana. Born in Spain, he represented Equatorial Guinea at international level.

International career
In July 2010, he received his first call for the Equatoguinean senior team and to play a friendly match against Morocco on 11 August 2010. But he had a bruised knee and didn't go. After a good 2012–13 season, in which he scored 10 goals in 34 league matches, Baruc received an international call again, this time for two FIFA World Cup qualifying matches against Cape Verde and Tunisia in June, 2013. He made his debut in a friendly against Togo on 5 June 2013.

Honours
Catalan Football Best Goal: 2012

References

External links

Profile in HKFA.

1984 births
Living people
People from Osona
Sportspeople from the Province of Barcelona
Citizens of Equatorial Guinea through descent
Spanish sportspeople of Equatoguinean descent
Equatoguinean sportspeople of Spanish descent
Equatoguinean people of Catalan descent
Spanish footballers
Equatoguinean footballers
Footballers from Catalonia
AEC Manlleu footballers
Kitchee SC players
UE Cornellà players
Tercera División players
Hong Kong First Division League players
Divisiones Regionales de Fútbol players
Equatorial Guinea international footballers
Equatoguinean expatriate footballers
Equatoguinean expatriate sportspeople in Hong Kong
Expatriate footballers in Hong Kong
Spanish expatriate footballers
Spanish expatriate sportspeople in Hong Kong
Association football midfielders